The Decoy Bride is a 2011 British romantic comedy film written by comedian Sally Phillips and Neil Jaworski, and starring David Tennant, Alice Eve and Kelly Macdonald and set on the fictional island of Hegg, supposedly located in the Outer Hebrides of Scotland. The film was made by Ecosse Films.

Plot
American movie star Lara Tyler is hounded by the press as she prepares to wed English author James Arber. Despite the efforts of her managers Steve and Emma, the secret wedding is interrupted by paparazzo Marco Ballani, determined to photograph the "wedding of the decade". Lara resolves to find a more remote location for her nuptials.

Katie Nic Aodh returns to her hometown on the tiny Scottish island of Hegg after breaking off her engagement. She moves back into "The Sunrise", the bed and breakfast run by her terminally ill mother Iseabail, taking up her former shop assistant job. Encouraged to write a guide book on Hegg, Katie documents the island’s eccentricities.

Captivated by James' enchanting – albeit fictional – description of Hegg in his latest book, Lara chooses to have their wedding on the island. They stay at the local castle, which Steve transforms to match the book. Katie unsuccessfully flirts with an incognito James, and Marco comes to stay at the Sunrise, disguised as a monk. Suspicious of Marco and recognizing Steve from the tabloids, Iseabail deduces what is happening and calls the press. Spotting Marco staking out the wedding chapel, Lara runs off.

With Lara missing, Steve proceeds with the ceremony, using a "decoy bride" to convince Marco he has succeeded in photographing the wedding, but without informing James. Katie reluctantly accepts the role for £5,000. Heavily veiled, she arrives at the Chapel and exchanges vows with James, but her dreadful American accent alerts him to the lie. The wedding party returns to the castle as the media descend on Hegg. Steve locks Katie and James in the bridal suite, keeping the press focused on the castle until Lara can be found. Katie and James bicker, and realize they may have been officially married.

Disguised as an elderly local, Lara sees Iseabail with a substantial payment for notifying the press. Lara is touched when Marco, unaware of her true identity, reveals that he has fallen in love with her. Infiltrating the castle, he bursts into the suite. He and James tussle, before Marco declares his love for Lara and leaves to find her. James follows suit, but is forced to rescue Katie when she falls into the moat.

They go to the Sunrise, bonding as they change out of their wet clothes. Marco intercepts Lara’s voicemail for James to meet her at a nearby cove. Recognized by Marco's editor, Lara kicks him in the face, before forcing Iseabail to toss her money off the cliffs. Finding Katie with James – wearing Katie's absentee father's vintage bagpiper's costume – Iseabail reveals that she summoned the press to the wedding. Believing Katie has orchestrated everything for money, James leaves to meet Lara.

An elderly deaf couple mistake James for Katie's father, and he attempts to play the bagpipes for them as they dance. Realizing she has fallen for him, Katie finds James. He is attacked by Katie's ex-boyfriend Angus, who begs her to take him back, but she declines. She and James consult Reverend McDonough, who declares that if James can reach Lara before nightfall, their wedding can proceed; he dissolves James and Katie's marriage. Katie confesses her feelings for James, but leads the paparazzi away as he meets Lara and the reverend, with Marco watching nearby.

Months later, Katie prepares to leave Hegg; she traveled the world with her mother before she died, with Lara's help, and her guidebook has been published. Departing by boat, she sees James arriving on the island. Having come to find her, he reveals that he has dedicated his latest book to her. They reunite on the docks, and share a kiss. Lara visits Marco, and they are caught by another paparazzo.

Cast
Kelly Macdonald as Katie Nic Aodh, the decoy bride
David Tennant as James Arber, a best-selling English writer engaged to Lara
Alice Eve as Lara Tyler, an American movie star
Michael Urie as Steve Korbitz, Lara's manager
Sally Phillips as Emma, Steve's assistant 
Maureen Beattie as Iseabail, Katie's mother
Federico Castelluccio as Marco Ballani, a photographer obsessed with Lara
Dylan Moran as Charley, Marco's editor
Jeannie Fisher as Aileen, a resident of Hegg
Hamish Clark as Angus, Muireen's husband and Katie's ex-boyfriend
James Fleet as Laird
Sally Howitt as Muireen
Hannah Bourne as Chloe
Matthew Chalmers as Callum
Rony Bridges as Roan
Victoria Grove as Anais Anais
Alisha Bailey as Surelle
Alex Childs as TV host
Tony Roper as Reverend McDonough
Ben Addis as Journalist 1
William Owen as Journalist 2
Calum MacNab as Journalist 3
Ross Armstrong as 1st Paparazzo
Samuel Roukin as 2nd Paparazzo
Patrick Regis as Hollywood Minister
Danny Bage as Hotel Doorman
Tona Gray as Elderly Woman
Gil Kolirin as Security Guard
Robert Fyfe as Ancient Crofter
Maryann Turner as Ancient Crofter's Wife
Achara Kirk as Tourist

Production
David Tennant said that the film was an homage to the 1983 Scotland-set film Local Hero.  The fictional island of Hegg was inspired by Jura and Eigg. It received the largest grant possible from Scottish Screen, £300,000.

Rehearsals started in London on 21 June 2010. Filming began on 27 June on the Isle of Man, before moving to Scotland. Filming ended on 31 July 2010.  Many of the outdoor scenes were filmed on the Isle of Man while other scenes were filmed in Glasgow and at the Caerlaverock Castle in Dumfries and by Loch Fyne in Argyll.

The score was written by Julian Nott.

CinemaNX distributed the film in the United Kingdom and HanWay Films is the international sales agent.

Reception
The film received mixed to negative reviews from critics. It holds a score of 23% on review aggregator Rotten Tomatoes and a score of 42/100 on Metacritic.

Neil Genzlinger of The New York Times liked the film, praising the performance by Tennant and Macdonald and the mocking of celebrity culture. Frank Scheck of The Hollywood Reporter called the film a "bland romantic comedy in the Richard Curtis style" but praises Macdonald's performance and concludes that her performance makes the film tolerable.

The A.V. Clubs Alison Willmore gave the film a "D+", criticizing that the talented cast and pretty scenery cannot save the film from the fact that it is "inescapably based on how romantic it is that someone would throw over his doting, famous fiancée for an ordinary girl" even though the story does not convey any reasons why this should happen. Michael Atkinson of The Village Voice called it a "pernicious tripe suitable only for masochists and the intellectually disabled" and notes that "the supposedly frothy tone is tarry and flavorless, and the drill is painfully familiar".

References

External links

British romantic comedy films
2011 romantic comedy films
Films about actors
Films about weddings in the United Kingdom
Films set in the Outer Hebrides
Films set on fictional islands
2010s English-language films
Films directed by Sheree Folkson
2010s British films